Daniel Studley (born 1 January 1992) is a British long-distance runner.

In 2012, he made his England Athletics debut at the Cross de Atapuerca in Burgos, Spain. In 2015, Dan won the England Athletics 10k Championships in Leeds, England. In 2018, he competed in the men's half marathon at the 2018 IAAF World Half Marathon Championships held in Valencia, Spain. He finished in 102nd place. In 2019, he won the men's race of the Windsor Half Marathon held in Windsor, United Kingdom.

Personal Bests

Course Records

References

External links 
 

Living people
1992 births
Place of birth missing (living people)
British male long-distance runners
British male marathon runners